Chankiri may be:

the Khmer name of Samanea saman, a species of tree
an alternative Anglicisation of the name of Çankırı, a city in Turkey